Tianjin Binhai International Airport , originally Tianjin Zhangguizhuang Airport is an airport located in Dongli District, Tianjin. It is one of the major air cargo centers in the People's Republic of China.

It is the hub airport for Tianjin Airlines, established in 2004, and privately owned Okay Airways, as well as a focus city for Air China.

In 2017, Tianjin Binhai International Airport handled 21,005,001 passengers, a growth of 24.5% over 2016, making it the 19th busiest airport in China.

The airport is also the site of the Airbus A320 final assembly line which started operations in 2008, and Airbus A330 Completion and Delivery Center which was completed by the end of 2017.

In 2018, Hainan Airlines started operating flights to Vancouver, making it the first intercontinental route serving the airport. However, the route was terminated in January 2019.

Development of the airport
Before 2005, commercial flights were handles in what is now the airport's cargo terminal. In 2006, a larger terminal was built and is now the passenger terminal. A huge expansion was made to the passenger terminal around 2010 to accommodate more passengers. It has 47 jet bridges and is one of the largest airports in China. It is located in a state-of-the-art terminal building, which is more than three times bigger than the previous terminal, at 116,000 m2. When the three construction phases are completed, the airport terminal will be over 500,000 m2 and will be able to handle 40 million passengers per year. Over the period of the project the airport site will enlarge from the current 25 km2 to 80 km2. The airport as a whole will resemble Amsterdam's Schiphol Airport in size and will be able to handle over 500,000 tons of cargo and 200,000 flights per year.

The expansion, with a total investment of nearly ¥3 billion (US$409.5 million), widened the runway to 75 m (from previous 50 m), and lengthened it to 3,600 m. In May 2009, the airport also completed the construction of a second runway, with the expected number of passengers exceeding ten million.

Tianjin Airlines is headquartered in the terminal.

On 28 August 2014, Tianjin Binhai International Airport Terminal 2 came into use. The second floor is used as an arrivals hall, while the first floor is a departure hall.
Underground, on level B1, there is a public transport hub, used to connect the airport terminal to various methods of public transportation. This includes a subway station level, a transfer hall and an underground parking lot. Terminal 2 is connected to subway line number 2, meaning that passengers can get to the terminal straight from Tianjin Railway Station.

Airlines and destinations

Passenger

Cargo

Statistics
In 2008, the airport handled 166,558 tonnes of freight, and became the 11th busiest airport in China. Tianjin Airport is also among the fastest-growing airports in China, registering a 20.2% increase by passenger traffic and a 33.2% increase in terms of cargo traffic in 2008.

Ground transportation
The Airport is served by Binhai International Airport Station on Line 2 of the Tianjin Metro since the station's opening on August 28, 2014. The metro fare to downtown is ¥3.

See also
Transport in Tianjin
List of airports in the People's Republic of China
China's busiest airports by passenger traffic

References

Links
Official website

Airports in Tianjin
Airports established in 1939